Jonathan Spence Stickland (born September 4, 1983) is a former Texas politician. From 2013 to 2021 he served as a Republican member of the Texas House of Representatives from District 92, which includes a portion of Tarrant County in suburban Fort Worth. He was re-elected in 2018. He did not seek re-election in 2020.

Background

In 1988, Stickland's parents moved the family from his native Plano in Collin County to Hurst in Tarrant County, where he attended W. A. Porter Elementary School and Smithfield Middle School. He enrolled for his freshman year at Richland High School and then for two years at the newly opened Birdville High School of the Birdville Independent School District, both in North Richland Hills in Tarrant County. Stickland dropped out of High School and obtained his G.E.D.

Stickland is not a college graduate.

Political life

Elections and House committees
When the incumbent Republican Representative Todd Smith did not seek reelection in 2012, Stickland defeated Roger Fisher, 6,332 votes (60.2 percent) to 4,190 (39.8 percent) in the Republican primary election held on May 29, 2012. In the general election on November 6, 2012, in conjunction with the U.S. presidential race, Stickland faced no Democratic opponent and defeated the Libertarian Party nominee, Sean D. Fatzinger of Fort Worth, 37,084 votes (80.7 percent) to 8,884 (19.3 percent).

In the Republican primary election held on March 4, 2014, Stickland defeated challenger Andy Cargile, a retired principal and school district trustee, earning 7,612 votes (65 percent) to Cargile's 4,102 votes (35 percent).

Stickland was a member of the House committees of (1) County Affairs and (2) Special Purpose Districts.

Legislative positions

An anti-abortion legislator, Stickland supported in 2013 the ban on abortion after twenty weeks of gestation; the measure passed the House, 96–49. He co-sponsored companion legislation to increase medical and licensing requirements of abortion providers, a law that the opponents claim could shut down many abortion clinics. These issues instigated a filibuster in the Texas State Senate by Wendy R. Davis of Fort Worth. The Texas Right to Life Committee rated Stickland 78 percent favorable, presenting him with a "Former Fetus" wall plaque which was briefly displayed on the wall outside Stickland's office at the Capitol building.

Stickland voted against the legislation to establish a taxpayer-funded breakfast program for public schools; the measure passed the House, 73–58. He co-sponsored legislation to provide marshals for school security as a separate law-enforcement entity. He voted for the extension of the franchise tax exemption to certain businesses, which passed the House 117–24. He voted against the adoption of the biennial 2013 state budget. He voted to require testing for narcotics of those individuals receiving unemployment compensation. Stickland voted against a bill relating to unlawful employment practices regarding discrimination in payment of compensation, which nevertheless passed the House, 78–61.

Stickland co-sponsored the measure to forbid the state from engaging in the enforcement of federal regulations of firearms. He also co-sponsored legislation to permit college and university officials to carry concealed weapons. He voted to reduce the time required to obtain a concealed-carry permit in Texas. He backed the redistricting bills for the state House and Senate and the United States House of Representatives. Stickland voted for term limits for certain state officials. He voted for legislation to forbid one individual from turning in multiple ballots.

In 2015, the political newsletter Quorum Report published online posts made by Stickland given to them by his Republican primary opponent, Scott Fisher. On an fantasy football forum, Stickland made comments regarding marital rape and marijuana use. Stickland stated in a prepared statement that during college "I wasted much of life, said and did things I wish I hadn't." Strickland has supported cannabis decriminalization and partial legalization.

Ratings and endorsements

In his First Session, Strickland was rated as the worst legislator in Texas by Texas Monthly. In 2013, Phyllis Schlafly's Eagle Forum, managed in Texas by Cathie Adams, a former state chairman of the Texas Republican Party, rated Stickland 100 percent favorable; the Young Conservatives of Texas, 97 percent. The Texas League of Conservation Voters rated him 38 percent; a similar group Environment Texas rated him 12 percent. The interest group, Texans for Fiscal Responsibility, founded by Michael Quinn Sullivan, rated him 100 percent. The National Rifle Association scored Stickland 92 percent. In 2017, Texans Uniting for Reform & Freedom scored Stickland 104 percent. In 2017, Texans for Fiscal Responsibility scored him at 100 percent and rated him as one of the top 10 Best Legislators of 2017.

In 2019, civil rights group Equality Texas gave Stickland a 0 percent rating. Environmental groups gave Stickland low ratings; the Texas League of Conservation Voters gave Stickland a 14 percent rating in 2015, while Environment Texas gave Stickland a 10 percent rating in 2019.

The marijuana legalization advocacy group National Organization for the Reform of Marijuana Laws (NORML) gave Stickland a 58 percent rating in 2019. The Texas Association of Realtors gave Stickland a 50 percent rating in 2013.

2016 reelection campaign

In the Republican primary on March 1, 2016, Stickland faced opposition in his bid for a third term from Scott Weston Fisher, the senior pastor since 2000 of the Metroplex Chapel in Euless, Texas. Fisher carried the backing of former Governor Rick Perry, who in 2008 appointed Fisher to the Texas Youth Commission. Stickland defeated Fisher in the primary election with 58% of the vote.

Comments made by Stickland in 2001 and 2008 in online forums generated controversy amid his primary campaign against Scott Fisher. Stickland apologized for his remarks. In 2008 in a post on a "fantasy sports message board, Stickland responded to a user's request for sex advice by saying, 'Rape is non existent in marriage, take what you want my friend!'"

2017 legislative session

In 2017, Stickland offered an unsuccessful amendment to prohibit state aid to the abatement of feral hogs. In retaliation for Stickland's amendment, his Republican colleague, Drew Springer, Jr., of Muenster, backed by Speaker Joe Straus of San Antonio, obtained passage of another amendment to defund $900,000 from the Texas Department of Transportation earmarked for Stickland's hometown of Bedford.

Stickland in 2017 authored HB375 which would allow Texans who were legally able to own firearms, to carry handguns without a permit from the state of Texas.

Stickland is one of only twelve House Republicans organized through the House Freedom Caucus, which he claims is the true representative of most conservative Republicans statewide. He has emerged as a critic of Speaker Joe Straus and an ally in the House of Lieutenant Governor Dan Patrick, the presiding officer of the Texas State Senate. In 2017, Patrick and Straus quarreled over the bathroom bill sponsored by State Senator Lois Kolkhorst of Brenham, which would require persons to use the public rest room corresponding with their genitalia at birth. Straus agreed to a more moderate bill because of what he called concerns about economic boycotts of Texas by business and athletic groups who view the bathroom legislation as infringing on the rights of transgender persons. The Patrick-Straus split created an impasse on the legislation as the regular session wound down. Stickland said, "I absolutely think that there is a fight going on for the heart and soul of the Republican Party."

Stickland used a legislative procedure called "chubbing" to prevent the consideration of over 200 bills by the Texas House, effectively killing the bills, in what Texas media referred to as the "Mothers Day Massacre."

2018 reelection

Stickland retained his state House seat in the general election held on November 6, 2018. With 29,697 (49.8 percent), he defeated his Democratic opponent, Steve Riddell, who polled 28,251 votes (47.4 percent). Libertarian Party choice, Eric P. Espinoza, received 1,641 votes (2.8 percent).

2019 legislative session

Stickland was the author of a bill to ban red light cameras in Texas. The bill passed both the House and the Senate. Governor Greg Abbott signed the bill into law on June 1, 2019.

At the end of the 2019 legislative session, when Texas Monthly published its perennial Best and Worst Legislators list, they gave Stickland the "first-ever Cockroach Award" and wrote that they were "enshrining the term for a lawmaker who accomplishes nothing but always manages to show up in the worst possible way." The reasons given for the newly created award included a "needless" Twitter fight between Stickland and a prominent vaccine researcher, in which Stickland called vaccines "sorcery" before saying he was only objecting to government-mandated vaccines, and Stickland's verbal sparring with other representatives who resurrected Governor Greg Abbott's signature $100 million plan for high school mental health services after Stickland used a procedural maneuver to kill it.

Personal life
Stickland and his wife, Krissy, met in church. The couple has two daughters.

References

External links
 Campaign website
 
 Jonathan Stickland at Texas Tribune

1983 births
Living people
Republican Party members of the Texas House of Representatives
People from Plano, Texas
People from Fort Worth, Texas
Businesspeople from Texas
Baptists from Texas
21st-century American politicians